Dead Maid Quarry is a 4,400 square metre geological Site of Special Scientific Interest in Mere, Wiltshire, England, notified in 1951. It lies in an area of industrial buildings off Castle Street on the south west outskirts of the tisn.

Sources

 Natural England citation sheet for the site  (accessed 24 March 2022)

External links
 Natural England (SSSI information)

Sites of Special Scientific Interest in Wiltshire
Sites of Special Scientific Interest notified in 1951
Quarries in Wiltshire
Mere, Wiltshire